is a mecha anime television series aired from 1980 to 1981. It ran for 50 episodes. It is also referred to as "God Sigma, Empire of Space" and "Space Combination God Sigma".

Concept
Space Emperor God Sigma was created by Toei's Television Division, under the name "Saburo Yatsude" and produced by Academy Production (who subcontracted Greenbox). The series was produced by the main Toei company, and not by Toei Animation; Yoshinobu Nishizaki's Academy Productions provided production assistance. Toei Agency handled the advertising for the show, and its main sponsor was Popy (now Bandai's Boy's Toys Division).

This anime was the last that Takashi Ijima would work on; he had been part of Toei's TV division's projects since Chōdenji Robo Combattler V, which aired in 1976. Joined by Katsuhiko Taguchi, the chief director, the two created an anime that lasted for four full seasons, which was rare at the time of its broadcast.

Story
The story is set in the year 2050 AD, and mankind has been steadily advancing its space technology. However, the planet is suddenly set upon by a mysterious enemy: the forces of Eldar, who came from 250 years in the future. In their time, 2300 AD, their planet Eldar was invaded by Earth, and soundly defeated by Earth's Trinity Energy, a mysterious energy used in their weaponry that possesses power many times that of a hydrogen bomb. The Eldar people's objective is to steal this Trinity Energy before it can be used against them.

The Eldar forces begin by taking over Jupiter's moon Io, one of the places humanity has immigrated to by then. After that, they begin to attack Trinity City with their legions of Cosmosauruses in order to steal the Trinity Energy. Toshiya and his friends use God Sigma to protect the planet and the Trinity Energy, and the battle evolves into a long war to retake Io.

Characters

Trinity City

Toshiya Dan
, Tomokazu Seki (in Super Robot Wars Z)
The protagonist of the show. He is an 18-year-old second-generation pioneer living on Jupiter's moon, Io. The main pilot of God Sigma.

Julie Noguchi

Assistant to Dr. Kazami, the head scientist and researcher at Trinity City. One of the three pilots of God Sigma.

Kira Kensaku

One of Toshiya's good friends, and also a native of Io.

Eldar's Forces

Supreme Commander Teral
, Hiromi Tsuru (in Super Robot Wars Z)
The supreme commander of the Eldar forces sent to Earth to steal the Trinity Energy.

Commander Leats

The commander of the Cosmosauruses, under Teral's command.

Jeela

A commander under Teral's command.

Mecha

God Sigma
The completed giant robot formed when the Kuuraioh, Kaimeioh, and Rikushin'oh combine with the Big-Wing.

With the command "Sigma Formation", the three robots form a triangle, and when they shout "Trinity Charge", the Big-Wing flies to them and combines. Two separate combination scenes exist in the anime - one during the beginning, and one from the middle onwards.

Its total height was originally stated to be 265 meters tall, but since this would cause difficulties for the actual animation, it was changed to 66 meters. It weighs 1200 tons, and its power source is Trinity Energy. It possesses the ability to cruise from Earth to Jupiter and back. It can be controlled by the main pilot, Toshiya, but without the other two component robots' generators to supplement his own, it's not as powerful.

In the final episode, it and the giant mecha Gargos destroy each other. However, it is repaired after the war and revamped to be a single-pilot machine, and Toshiya sets off with it by himself.

Staff
 Original Work: Saburo Yatsude
 Producer: Takashi Ijima, Heita Ezu (Tokyo Channel 12), Itaru Orita (Toei TV Division)
 Music: Hiroshi Tsutsui
 Music Performance: Tokyo Indoors Music Society
 Chief Director: Takeyuki Kanda (episodes 1-10), Katsuhiko Taguchi (episodes 11-50)
 Character Design: Kazuhiko Utaka
 Character Concepts: Kaoru Shintani
 Design Assistance: Yutaka Izubuchi
 Mechanical Design: Katsushi Murakami, Submarine
 Artistic Director: Kazuo Okada, Tadanoumi Shimokawa
 Music Director: Jouhei Kawamura
 Animation Production: Greenbox, Anime City, Sunluck
 Production Assistance: Academy Production, Tokyo Dôga
 Production: Toei Company, Ltd., Toei Agency (advertising)

Theme songs
Opening Theme: "Ganbare! Uchuu no Senshi" (Do your Best, Space Warrior!)
 Vocals: Sasaki Isao, Koroogi '73, Columbia Yurikago-kai
 Lyrics: Saburo Yatsude
 Composition: Asei Kobayashi
 Arrangement: Masahisa Takeichi

Ending Theme: "Red Blue Yellow"
 Vocals: Kumiko Kaori, Koroogi '73, Columbia Yurikago-kai
 Lyrics: Saburo Yatsude
 Composition: Asei Kobayashi
 Arrangement: Masahisa Takeichi

The ending theme, "Red Blue Yellow", consists of the planets in the Solar System in order. At the time of the show's broadcast, Pluto was actually inside the orbit of Neptune. This was not reflected in the animation, the reason being that the show itself is set in the year 2050. Also, the rings of Jupiter had just been discovered the year before, so in the ending animation, Jupiter is depicted with rings. However, in contrast to the actual rings of Jupiter, which are too thin to see a shadow cast on the planet, the picture of Jupiter in the ending sequence does have the shadow of rings on it.

Media

The series was telecast in Italy under the title God Sigma, l'imperatore dello spazio (the Italian translation of the full Japanese title).

God Sigma toys were released under the premier Godaikin toy label in Japan and Hong Kong in the 1980s.

On March 16, 2011, Pony Canyon released a complete DVD box set, which only had a limited production run. This is the first and only digital version of the show.

Appearances in other works
Space Emperor God Sigma appears in various games by Banpresto (currently Bandai Namco Games). Its first appearance was in a 1992 Famicom game called Shuffle Fight. Its second was in the 2008 PS2 game Super Robot Wars Z. However, by this time, Toshiya's voice actor Tomiyama Kei had died, so the role was given to Tomokazu Seki instead. In the same game, a robot from Gravion called God Σ Gravion appears, triggering a conversation between the characters of each series. God Sigma also appears in the game's two-part sequel, 2nd Super Robot Wars Z: Hakai-hen and Saisei-hen.

References

External links
 
 
Encirobot.com (Italian)

1980 anime television series debuts
1980 Japanese television series debuts
1981 Japanese television series endings
Adventure anime and manga
Animated space adventure television series
Kaoru Shintani
Super robot anime and manga
TV Tokyo original programming
Toei Animation television